Robert Wickhampton was a medieval Bishop of Salisbury.

Wickhampton was a canon of Salisbury before he was Dean of Salisbury by 17 January 1258. He was also a papal chaplain. He had a dispensation for his election to the bishopric due to his illegitimacy. He was elected to the see of Salisbury about 23 February 1271 and consecrated on 13 May 1274. He died on 24 April 1284. Before his death, he became blind, and a coadjutor was appointed to the see on 12 February 1282. He may have been related to an archdeacon of Salisbury, Thomas de Wickhampton.

Citations

References
 British History Online Bishops of Salisbury accessed on 30 October 2007
 

Bishops of Salisbury
Deans of Salisbury
13th-century English Roman Catholic bishops
1284 deaths
Year of birth unknown